Paris is a town in Oneida County, New York, United States. The town is in the southeast part of the county and is south of Utica. The population was 4,411 at the 2010 census. The town was named after an early benefactor, Colonel Isaac Paris.

History
The town was formed in 1792 from part of the town of Whitestown. In 1795, part of Paris was used to found the town of Sherburne (now in Chenango County).

The St. Paul's Church and Cemetery at Paris Hill was listed on the National Register of Historic Places in 1996.

Notable people

Asa Gray, botanist
Orson S. Head, lawyer, Wisconsin State Senator
Joseph E. Irish, clergyman, Wisconsin State Senator
Gerrit P. Judd, physician, missionary to Kingdom of Hawaii
Arthur Cushman McGiffert, theologian
David Pendleton Oakerhater, Cheyenne warrior, Episcopal deacon and saint
Michael O'Donoghue, writer and performer
Edward Tompkins, California State Senator
Charlemagne Tower, lawyer, soldier, and businessman
Albert J. Winegar, Wisconsin State Assemblyman

Geography

The eastern town line is the border of Herkimer County.

Demographics

As of the census of 2000, there were 4,609 people, 1,714 households, and 1,273 families.  The population density was 146.6 people per square mile (56.6/km2).  There were 1,806 housing units at an average density of 57.4 per square mile (22.2/km2).  The racial makeup of the town was 98.31% White, 0.35% African American, 0.07% Native American, 0.22% Asian, 0.02% Pacific Islander, 0.20% from other races, and 0.85% from two or more races. Hispanic or Latino of any race were 0.54% of the population.

There were 1,714 households, out of which 38.4% had children under the age of 18 living with them, 60.3% were married couples living together, 9.3% had a female householder with no husband present, and 25.7% were non-families. 22.2% of all households were made up of individuals, and 9.7% had someone living alone who was 65 years of age or older.  The average household size was 2.68 and the average family size was 3.15.

In the town, the population was spread out, with 27.3% under the age of 18, 7.1% from 18 to 24, 28.0% from 25 to 44, 25.6% from 45 to 64, and 12.0% who were 65 years of age or older.  The median age was 39 years. For every 100 females, there were 97.0 males.  For every 100 females age 18 and over, there were 97.2 males.

The median income for a household in the town was $41,571, and the median income for a family was $50,379. Males had a median income of $35,867 versus $26,315 for females. The per capita income for the town was $18,446. About 6.0% of families and 7.3% of the population were below the poverty line, including 9.7% of those under age 18 and 3.6% of those age 65 or over.

Communities and locations in Paris
Cassville – A hamlet west of Richfield Junction. It was named after Lewis Cass after it was founded in 1803.
Clayville – A village in the southeastern part of the town.
Grange Hill – An elevation located east of Paris.
Greens Crossing – A hamlet east of Paris Station.
Ludlow Corners – A location southeast of Clayville.
Paris – A hamlet.
Paris Station – A hamlet south of Paris hamlet near the western town boundary.
Richfield Junction – A hamlet near the southern town line on NY 8.
Sauquoit – This hamlet in the northern part of the town is the location of the town government. It was the second settlement made in the town.
Sauquoit Creek – An important stream flowing through the town.
Tassel Hill – Highest point in Oneida County. Located in the southern part of the town, east of NY 12 on the borders of the towns of Bridgewater, Marshall, and Sangerfield.

References

External links
 Town of Paris, NY

Utica–Rome metropolitan area
Towns in Oneida County, New York